The București Experiment is a 2013 Romanian film directed by British filmmaker Tom Wilson and starring Carmen Anton. It was winner of the Gopo Award for Best Long Documentary in 2014.

References

External links
 

2013 films
Romanian documentary films
Documentary films about Romania
2013 documentary films